The  is a men's professional basketball club based in Tokorozawa, Saitama Prefecture, Japan. It calls the whole prefecture home and its main home arenas are Tokorozawa Municipal Gymnasium and Saitama Super Arena in Chūō-ku, Saitama City. It competes in the B.League.

History
1982: founded as an amateur  basketball club.
1983: The nickname Broncos taken from Santa Clara University.
1987: Promoted to Japan Basketball League division 1.
1991: Club renamed to 
1996: The company club was dissolved.
1997: Restarts as a community-based club . From a lower-tier .
1998: Renamed . Promoted to the JBL division 2.
1999: The league reorganisation put the team to the new JBL.
2000: Adds Saitama City to its hometowns. Renamed hiragana .
2002-03, 2004-05: Wins the premiership in two-peat.
2005: Quits the JBL. Renamed kanji . Competes in the bj league as an inaugural member.

Roster

Notable players
To appear in this section a player must have either:
 Set a club record or won an individual award as a professional player.
 Played at least one official international match for his senior national team or one NBA game at any time.

Coaches

Tomoya Higashino
Charles Johnson
Kenji Yamane
David Benoit 
Masato Fukushima
Bob Nash
Dean Murray
Natalie Nakase
Tracy Williams
Takatoshi Ishibashi
Kazuaki Shimoji
Ryutaro Onodera
Collier St. Clair
Thomas Roijakkers
John Saintignon

Arenas

Urawa Komaba Gymnasium
Tokorozawa Municipal Gymnasium
Josai University
Fukaya Big Turtle
Kasukabe City General Gymnasium
Cosmos Arena Fukiage
Shiki Citizens Gymnasium

References
 :ja:埼玉ブロンコス as 2007-06-06T02:55:59 by S-8500

External links
 Official (Japanese)

 
Basketball teams in Japan
Sports teams in Saitama (city)
Basketball teams established in 1982
1982 establishments in Japan